The Ashland Masonic Lodge Building is a historic building located in Ashland, Oregon. Constructed in 1909 as a meeting hall for a local Masonic lodge, it was listed on the National Register of Historic Places in 1992.  

It was built in 1880 as a two-story brick building in Italianate to a design by local contractor L.S.P. Marsh.  It was expanded in its second floor in 1909 with design by local architect Frank C. Clark, and Clark also designed a third floor added in 1928 along with a remodeling of the building facade into Georgian style.  The remodelling added a "a pilaster strip colonnade with stylized Corinthian capitals and full entablature
framing the central five bays".

With a  frontage, and its superior height of three stories, the building came to "dominate" the block of
buildings defining the west side of Ashland's town square.

Renovations on the first floor followed a fire in 1959.

It was deemed significant for National Register listing in part as its main assembly hall, an upstairs "clear span space 45 feet wide and 55 feet long" with detailed ceiling beams, cornice moldings, pilasters and an encircling entablature, "is one of the few intact lodge rooms of pre-World War I vintage remaining in southern Oregon, and it is replete with historic furniture and equippage."

It was included again on the National Register in 2000 as a contributing building in the Ashland Downtown Historic District.

References

Masonic buildings completed in 1909
Clubhouses on the National Register of Historic Places in Oregon
Georgian Revival architecture in Oregon
Former Masonic buildings in Oregon
Buildings and structures in Ashland, Oregon
1909 establishments in Oregon
Individually listed contributing properties to historic districts on the National Register in Oregon
National Register of Historic Places in Jackson County, Oregon
Ashland Downtown Historic District